Zugrăvescu is a Romanian surname. Notable people with the surname include:

Dorel Zugrăvescu (1930–2019), Romanian geophysicist
Gabriel Zugrăvescu, Romanian handball player, manager, and author

Romanian-language surnames